Bangladesh participated at the 2014 Commonwealth Games in Glasgow, Scotland. The Bangladesh Olympic Association announced that its delegation for the games would consist to 30 athletes in 10 sports. The total of 30 athletes consisted of eight athletes in shooting, four in weightlifting, three each in cycling, table tennis and boxing; two each in athletics, badminton, swimming and wrestling; and one in gymnastics.

Medalists

Athletics

Men

Women

Badminton

Men

Boxing

Men

Cycling

Track

Sprint

Time trial

Team sprint

Gymnastics

Artistic

Men

Shooting

Clay target

Men

Pistol

Women

Small bore

Men

Women

Swimming

Men

Women

Table tennis

Men

Qualification Legend: Q=Main Bracket (medal); qB=Consolation Bracket (non-medal)

Weightlifting

Men

Women

Wrestling

Men's freestyle

References

Bangladesh at the Commonwealth Games
Nations at the 2014 Commonwealth Games
2014 in Bangladeshi sport